Paweł Wojciechowski (born 6 June 1989) is a Polish pole vaulter. He won the gold medal at the 2011 World Championships in Athletics.

Career 
Wojciechowski's first major success was the silver medal at the IAAF 12th World Junior Championships in Athletics held in July 2008 in Bydgoszcz, with the result , being until then his personal best. He is an athlete of the Zawisza Bydgoszcz club. His coach is Roman Dakiniewicz.

In March 2009 it was announced, that Wojciechowski would be admitted to take practices in May 2009 with Vitaly Petrov, the pole vault coach of Sergey Bubka and Yelena Isinbayeva. He improved his best mark to 5.86 m at the Flanders Indoor Meeting in February 2011 to break Mirosław Chmara's Polish indoor record, which had stood for 22 years.

Wojciechowski was the surprise winner at the 2011 World Championships in Athletics, but he fared less well at the 2012 Summer Olympics, failing to record a mark in qualifying. He missed the 2013 season due to injury and did not defend his world title as a result. In 2015, he cleared 5.85 m to win bronze at the World Championships.

In 2017, he improved his personal best to 5.93 m.

Achievements

Personal bests
Outdoor
 5.93 m (Lausanne 2017) 

Indoor
 5.90 m (Glasgow 2019)

References

External links
 
 
 

Living people
1989 births
Polish male pole vaulters
Sportspeople from Bydgoszcz
Athletes (track and field) at the 2012 Summer Olympics
Athletes (track and field) at the 2016 Summer Olympics
Olympic athletes of Poland
World Athletics Championships medalists
World Athletics Championships athletes for Poland
European Athletics Championships medalists
Zawisza Bydgoszcz athletes
Polish Athletics Championships winners
World Athletics Championships winners
European Athletics Indoor Championships winners
Athletes (track and field) at the 2020 Summer Olympics